The National Association of Cider Makers is a membership organisation that represents the UK cider industry.

Function
Formed in 1920,  the NACM represents cider makers, large and small, across Great Britain and Northern Ireland. The major centres of production are in Herefordshire and Somerset in England, but cider makers are now present outside of these traditional areas.

The UK cider industry produces around 750 million litres of cider a year, utilising 56% of all the apples grown in the UK. Cider has less than a 7% share of the UK drinks market, considerably less than beer, wine and spirits.

Twice a year the NACM hosts a reception at Westminster with the All Party Parliamentary Cider Group to champion cider makers and the wider cider category.

Structure
Members include:
 Aspall
 Aston Manor 
 C&C Group
 Carlsberg (Somersby)
 Cornish Orchards
 H. P. Bulmer
 Merrydown
 Molson Coors
Sheppy's
 Thatchers
 Weston's

References

External links
 NACM
 UK Cider Wiki
 AICV
 Welsh Perry and Cider Society 
 Three Counties Cider and Perry Association
 South West of England Cider Makers Association

Food industry trade groups based in the United Kingdom
British ciders
Organizations established in 1920
1920 establishments in the United Kingdom
Organisations based in Hertfordshire